Blackstone's Card Trick Without Cards is a magic trick. As the trick requires only that a card is thought of, it does not require the use of a deck of cards.

Method 
A spectator is instructed to think of any card (other than the joker). The magician then gives the following instructions:

 Take the card's face value (with aces counting as 1 and royal cards counting as 11, 12 and 13 respectively)
 Double it.
 Add 3.
 Multiply by 5.
 If the card the spectator is thinking of is a spade, subtract 1.
 If the card the spectator is thinking of is a heart, subtract 2.
 If the card the spectator is thinking of is a club, subtract 3.
 If the card the spectator is thinking of is a diamond, subtract 4.

The spectator then tells the magician the number the spectator is now thinking of. The magician then names the card.

Secret 

The series of mathematical manipulations results in any given card producing a unique number. The multiplication by 2 and 5 means that the final number is ten times the card's value, plus a fixed 15 (for the addition of 3 and the multiplication by 5) and an additional suit-dependent figure. Thus both suit and value are readily identifiable.  

To find their card, you take the first digit of their number and subtract 1 to get the number on the card. The suit is based on the second digit of their number. 4 for Spades, 3 for Hearts, 2 for Clubs, and 1 for Diamonds. For example, if their number is 64, then their card would be the 5 of Spades.

Literature

Harry Blackstone, Blackstone's Tricks Anyone Can Do 
John Scarne, Scarne on Card Tricks

References

Card tricks